Heinz Werner (17 August 1910 – 6 May 1989) was a German international footballer.

References

1910 births
1989 deaths
Association football midfielders
German footballers
Germany international footballers